Ivet Goranova (born 6 March 2000) is a Bulgarian karateka. She won the gold medal in the women's 55 kg event at the 2020 Summer Olympics in Tokyo, Japan. She also won the gold medal in the women's 55 kg event at the 2019 European Games held in Minsk, Belarus.

Career 

In 2018, she won one of the bronze medals in the women's kumite 55 kg event at the World Karate Championships held in Madrid, Spain. In 2019, she won one of the bronze medals in the women's kumite 55 kg event at the European Karate Championships held in Guadalajara, Spain. In that same year, she won the gold medal in the women's kumite 55 kg event at the European Games held in Minsk, Belarus. In the final, she defeated Anzhelika Terliuga of Ukraine.

She qualified at the World Olympic Qualification Tournament in Paris, France to represent Bulgaria at the 2020 Summer Olympics in Tokyo, Japan. She won the gold medal in the women's 55 kg event. In November 2021, she won one of the bronze medals in the women's 55 kg event at the World Karate Championships held in Dubai, United Arab Emirates.

She competed in the women's kumite 55 kg at the 2022 World Games held in Birmingham, United States.

Achievements

Honours 
 Bulgarian Sportsperson of the Year (2021)

References

External links 

 
 

2000 births
Living people
Bulgarian female karateka
European Games medalists in karate
European Games gold medalists for Bulgaria
Karateka at the 2019 European Games
Karateka at the 2020 Summer Olympics
Olympic karateka of Bulgaria
Olympic medalists in karate
Medalists at the 2020 Summer Olympics
Olympic gold medalists for Bulgaria
Competitors at the 2022 World Games
Sportspeople from Pleven
People from Pleven Province
21st-century Bulgarian women